Pristurus is a genus of geckos endemic to Arabia and Socotra Island as well as the Middle East and the Horn of Africa. Species of Pristurus are commonly known as rock geckos .

The generic name Pristurus means "saw-tailed" in Latin.[출처 필요]

Species and subspecies
The following species and subspecies are recognized:
Pristurus abdelkuri Arnold, 1986 – Abdel Kuri rock gecko 
Pristurus adrarensis Geniez & Arnold, 2006
Pristurus carteri (Gray, 1863) – Carter's rock gecko, Carter's semaphore gecko
Pristurus carteri carteri (Gray, 1863)
Pristurus carteri tuberculatus Parker, 1931
Pristurus celerrimus Arnold, 1977 – Oman rock gecko, bar-tailed semaphore gecko
Pristurus collaris (Steindachner, 1867) – collared rock gecko 
Pristurus crucifer (Valenciennes, 1861) – Valenciennes rock gecko, cross-marked semaphore gecko 
Pristurus flavipunctatus Rüppell, 1835 – Middle Eastern rock gecko, Rüppell's semaphore gecko
Pristurus gallagheri Arnold, 1986 - Gallagher's rock gecko, Wadi Kharrar rock gecko
Pristurus guichardi Arnold, 1986 – Guichard's rock gecko 
Pristurus insignis Blanford, 1881 – Blanford's rock gecko 
Pristurus insignoides Arnold, 1986 - Haggier Massif rock gecko
Pristurus longipes W. Peters, 1871 - Peters's rock gecko
Pristurus masirahensis Tamar, Mitsi, Simo-Riudalbas, Tejero-Cicuéndez, Al-Sariri, & Carranza, 2019
Pristurus mazbah Al-Safadi, 1989 
Pristurus minimus Arnold, 1977 – Arnold's rock gecko, least semaphore gecko
Pristurus obsti Rösler & Wranik, 1999 - mangrove semaphore gecko
Pristurus ornithocephalus Arnold, 1986 - birdhead rock gecko 
Pristurus phillipsii Boulenger, 1895 – Somali rock gecko 
Pristurus popovi Arnold, 1982 – Saudi rock gecko 
Pristurus rupestris Blanford, 1874 – Persia rock gecko, rock semaphore gecko, Blanford's semaphore gecko
Pristurus rupestris guweirensis G. Haas, 1943
Pristurus rupestris iranicus K.P. Schmidt, 1952 – Iranian rock gecko
Pristurus rupestris rupestris Blanford, 1874 
Pristurus saada Arnold, 1986 – Yemen rock gecko 
Pristurus samhaensis Rösler & Wranik, 1999
Pristurus schneideri Rösler, J. Köhler & Böhme, 2008
Pristurus simonettai (Lanza & Sassi, 1968) – coastal rock gecko 
Pristurus sokotranus Parker, 1938 – Socotra rock gecko 
Pristurus somalicus Parker, 1932 – Somali rock gecko, Somali semaphore gecko

Nota bene: A binomial authority or trinomial authority in parentheses indicates that the species or subspecies was originally described in a genus other than Pristurus.

References

Further reading
Arnold EN (1986). "New species of semaphore gecko (Pristurus: Gekkonidae) from Arabia and Socotra". Fauna of Saudi Arabia 8: 352-377.
Boulenger GA (1885). Catalogue of the Lizards in the British Museum (Natural History). Second Edition. Volume I. Geckonidæ, ... London: Trustees of the British Museum (Natural History). (Taylor and Francis, printers). xii + 436 pp. + Plates I-XXXII. (Genus Pristurus, p. 52).
Rüppell E (1835). Neue Wirbelthiere zu der Fauna von Abyssinien gehörig: Amphibien. Frankfurt am Main: S. Schmerber. 34 pp. (Pristurus, new genus, p. 16). (in German).

 
Lizard genera
Taxa named by Eduard Rüppell